Ariana Washington (born August 27, 1996) is an American sprinter specializing in the 100 m and 200 m. She represented the United States in the  relay at the 2016 Summer Olympics in Rio de Janeiro, and earned a gold medal at the 2017 World Championships as part of the relay team.

Early life
Ariana Washington was born August 27, 1996 in Signal Hill, California. Washington attended Long Beach Poly High School where she participated in track and field. As a sophomore, her team the Long Beach Poly Jackrabbits won the Penn Relays. Washington won state titles at 100 and 200 meters for her sophomore, junior, and senior years of high school.

Collegiate athlete
In her first year at the University of Oregon, Washington won NCAA titles for 100 meters and 200 meters. She was the first freshman to win both titles.

Olympian
Washington raced in both the 100 and the 200 meter distances at the U.S. Olympic Trials for the 2016 Summer Olympics in Rio de Janeiro, finishing six and fifth respectively. Although she did not qualify as an individual at either distance, she was selected for the United States relay pool in the  relay. The community of Long Beach, California raised money to allow Washington's mother and brother to watch her compete in Rio de Janeiro.

Personal life
Washington met fellow Olympian Clayton Murphy over a game of Uno at the USA Track and Field Athletes Lounge in the Olympic Village at the 2016 Summer Olympics in Rio. They got engaged in 2018, and were married in the Napa Valley on December 7, 2019.

References

External links

 
 
 
 
 
 Ariana Washington at Oregon Ducks
 

Living people
1996 births
American female sprinters
African-American female track and field athletes
Track and field athletes from California
Sportspeople from Los Angeles County, California
Olympic track and field athletes of the United States
Athletes (track and field) at the 2016 Summer Olympics
Oregon Ducks women's track and field athletes
People from Signal Hill, California
World Athletics Championships athletes for the United States
World Athletics Championships medalists
World Athletics Championships winners
21st-century African-American sportspeople
21st-century African-American women
Long Beach Polytechnic High School alumni